Johann Sebastian Bach composed the church cantata  (Praise the Lord, the mighty King of honor), 137, in Leipzig for the twelfth Sunday after Trinity and first performed it on 19 August 1725. The chorale cantata is based on the hymn by Joachim Neander (1680).

History and words 
Bach composed the cantata for the Twelfth Sunday after Trinity. It forms part of a cycle of chorale cantatas which Bach composed in Leipzig over a period of two years 1724–25. In 1724, his second year in the city, Bach had composed chorale cantatas between the first Sunday after Trinity of 1724 and Palm Sunday, but for Easter had returned to cantatas on more varied texts, possibly because he lost his librettist. Later Bach composed again chorale cantatas to complete his second annual cycle. This cantata is one of the completing works. It is based entirely on the unchanged words on the hymn "" (1680) by Joachim Neander.

The prescribed readings for the Sunday were from the Second Epistle to the Corinthians, the ministry of the Spirit, and from the Gospel of Mark, the healing of a deaf mute man. Unlike most chorale cantatas of the second cycle, but similar to the early , Bach left the chorale text unchanged, thus without a reference to the readings.

John Eliot Gardiner assumes, looking at the festive instrumentation and the general content of praise and thanksgiving, that the cantata was also performed that year to celebrate Ratswahl, the inauguration of the town council. Bach used in 1729 the setting of the final chorale, transposed to D major, to conclude the wedding cantata  with the last two stanzas of the hymn.

Scoring and structure 
The cantata in five movements is festively scored for four soloists, soprano, alto, tenor and bass, a four-part choir, and a Baroque instrumental ensemble of three trumpets, timpani, two oboes, two violins, viola, and basso continuo.

 Chorus: 
 Aria (alto): 
 Aria (soprano, bass): 
 Aria (tenor): 
 Chorale:

Music 
As Alfred Dürr and Gardiner observed, the text as well as the chorale melody is present in all movements. The cantata is constructed in symmetry: the soprano carries the melody in the outer movements, in movement 2 it is sung by the alto, and in movement 4 played by the trumpet. In the central movement, the beginning of both the vocal and the instrumental theme are derived from it in the most intimate setting of the work.

In the opening chorus the trumpets, oboes and strings play a concerto; the soprano sings the cantus firmus while the lower voices prepare the entries by imitation on the instrumental motifs. For the words "" (Come join the crowd, psaltery and harps, awake!), the setting is homophonic and accented.

In movement 2, a violin accompanies the embellished melody of the chorale. Bach included this movement in his Schübler Chorales, but on a text for Advent, "".

In great contrast to C major and G major, the central duet is in E minor. Two obbligato oboes take part in the setting. In an unusual way, the first vocal section is repeated three times; only the words "" (in how much suffering) are set differently in "grinding chromatic descent".

Movement 4 is in A minor, but the cantus firmus of the trumpet is nonetheless in C major, in "a battle for harmonic supremacy". In the final movement of his Christmas Oratorio Bach would later embed the chorale in doric mode in a concerto in D major. The independent vocal line quotes parts of the chorale melody several times. The words "" (consider this) are accented to a different meter.

Bach set the closing chorale for four vocal parts, doubled by the strings and oboes, in a rather homophonic style, but adds a second quartet formed with the three trumpets and the timpani, the first trumpet "[soaring] above all", effectively illustrating the words of the final lines for an affirmative conclusion. Gardiner notes that Bach "knew exactly how best to use the resources of the ceremonial trumpet-led orchestra and choir of his day to convey unbridled joy and majesty."

Recordings 
 Bach Made in Germany Vol. 1 – Cantatas VII, Günther Ramin, Thomanerchor, Gewandhausorchester, soloists of Thomanerchor, Helmut Krebs, Franz Kelch, Eterna 1953
 J. S. Bach: Cantatas BWV 137 & BWV 190, Hans Thamm, Windsbacher Knabenchor, Consortium Musicum, Teresa Żylis-Gara, Ingeborg Ruß, Peter Schreier, Franz Crass, EMI 1966
 Les Grandes Cantates de J.S. Bach Vol. 27, Fritz Werner, Heinrich-Schütz-Chor Heilbronn, Pforzheim Chamber Orchestra, Ingeborg Reichelt, Barbara Scherler, Friedrich Melzer, Bruce Abel, Erato 1973
 Bach Cantatas Vol. 4 – Sundays after Trinity I, Karl Richter, Münchener Bach-Chor, Münchener Bach-Orchester, Edith Mathis, Julia Hamari, Peter Schreier, Dietrich Fischer-Dieskau, Archiv Produktion 1977
 Die Bach Kantate Vol. 10, Helmuth Rilling, Gächinger Kantorei, Bach-Collegium Stuttgart, Arleen Augér, Gabriele Schreckenbach, Adalbert Kraus, Walter Heldwein, Hänssler 1982
 Bach Made in Germany Vol. 4 – Cantatas IV, Hans-Joachim Rotzsch, Thomanerchor, Neues Bachisches Collegium Musicum, Arleen Augér, Ortrun Wenkel, Peter Schreier, Theo Adam, Eterna 1982
 J. S. Bach: Das Kantatenwerk – Sacred Cantatas Vol. 2, Nikolaus Harnoncourt, Tölzer Knabenchor & Chorus Viennensis, Concentus Musicus Wien, boy soprano of the Tölzer Knabenchor, Paul Esswood, Kurt Equiluz, Albert Hartinger, Teldec 1983
 Bach Edition Vol. 19 – Cantatas Vol. 10, conductor Pieter Jan Leusink, Holland Boys Choir, Netherlands Bach Collegium, Marjon Strijk, Sytse Buwalda, Knut Schoch, Bas Ramselaar, Brilliant Classics 2000
 Bach Cantatas Vol. 6: Köthen/Frankfurt, John Eliot Gardiner, Monteverdi Choir, English Baroque Soloists, Katharine Fuge, Robin Tyson, Christoph Genz, Peter Harvey, Soli Deo Gloria 2000
 J. S. Bach: Complete Cantatas Vol. 18, Ton Koopman, Amsterdam Baroque Orchestra & Choir, Johannette Zomer, Christoph Prégardien, Klaus Mertens, Antoine Marchand 2002
 J. S. Bach: Cantatas Vol. 40, Masaaki Suzuki, Bach Collegium Japan, Yukari Nonoshita, Robin Blaze, Makoto Sakurada, Peter Kooy, BIS 2007

References

Sources 
 
 Lobe den Herren, den mächtigen König der Ehren BWV 137; BC A 124 / Chorale cantata (12th Sunday after Trinity) Bach Digital
 Cantata BWV 137 Lobe den Herren, den mächtigen König der Ehren history, scoring, sources for text and music, translations to various languages, discography, discussion, Bach Cantatas Website
 BWV 137 Lobe den Herren, den mächtigen König der Ehren English translation, University of Vermont
 BWV 137 Lobe den Herren, den mächtigen König der Ehren text, scoring, University of Alberta
 Luke Dahn: BWV 137.5 bach-chorales.com

External links 
 Lobe den Herren, den mächtigen König der Ehren, BWV 137: performance by the Netherlands Bach Society (video and background information)

Church cantatas by Johann Sebastian Bach
1725 compositions
Chorale cantatas